Terry Thompson is an American politician currently serving in the Missouri House of Representatives from Missouri's 53rd district. He won the seat after defeating Democrat Connie Simmons 67.6% to 22.9%, with other candidates receiving 9.5% of the vote. He was sworn in on January 6, 2021.

Electoral History

References

Republican Party members of the Missouri House of Representatives
21st-century American politicians
Living people
Year of birth missing (living people)